Timothy Navaratnam Horshington was a pioneering broadcaster of Radio Ceylon, the oldest radio station in South Asia. Horshington was one of the earliest Tamil announcers to be appointed to the panel of announcers in the 1950s by Livy Wijemanne and 
Clifford Dodd. He was very popular with listeners on the island - Ceylonese enjoyed listening to his mellow voice over Radio Ceylon - the radio station ruled the airwaves in the 1950s and 1960s in South Asia.

Tim Horshington was sent to Australia in 1952-1953 on training placement with the Macquarie Broadcasting Service in Sydney.

He presented radio programs such as 'Ponds Hit Parade,' and 'Holiday Choice' over the airwaves of Radio Ceylon.

He died on 8 May 2002 in Toronto, Ontario, Canada.

See also
Radio Ceylon
Vernon Corea
Sri Lanka Broadcasting Corporation
List of Sri Lankan broadcasters

References

Bibliography 
 Wavell, Stuart. - The Art of Radio - Training Manual written by the Director Training of the CBC. - Ceylon Broadcasting Corporation, 1969.

External links
Sri Lanka Broadcasting Corporation
Vernon Corea The Golden Voice of Radio Ceylon
 SLBC-creating new waves of history
Eighty Years of Broadcasting in Sri Lanka

Sri Lankan radio personalities
2002 deaths
Sri Lankan Tamil journalists
Year of birth missing